The men's 50 metre rifle three positions team competition at the 2010 Asian Games in Guangzhou, China was held on 18 November at the Aoti Shooting Range.

The men's 50 metre rifle three positions consists of the prone, standing and kneeling positions, fired in that order, with 3×40 shots for men.

The men's match has separate commands and times for each position, giving each shooter 45 minutes to complete the prone part, 75 minutes for the standing part, and 60 minutes for the kneeling part, including sighting shots for each part.

The top eight competitors reach the final, where the score zones are divided into tenths, giving up to 10.9 points for each shot. The men's final consists of ten shots from the standing position, with a time limit of 75 seconds per shot. The competition is won by the shooter who reaches the highest aggregate score (qualification + final, maximum 1309.0).

South Korea won the Asian Games team title of this men's 50m rifle three positions event. The Korean trio of Han Jin-seop, Kim Jong-hyun and Lee Hyun-tae, collected a combined total of 3489 points, Kazakhstan finished second and won the silver medal, while China finished third.

Schedule
All times are China Standard Time (UTC+08:00)

Records

Results

References

ISSF Results Overview

External links
Official website

Men Rifle 50 3P T